Adam Saks (born 1974 in Copenhagen) is a Danish painter who lives and works in Berlin.

Biography 
Adam Saks studied at the Royal Academy of Fine Art in Copenhagen from 1993 to 1999. In 1996–1997 he studied under Professor Bernd Koberling at the Hochschule der Künste in Berlin.

Adam Saks is a painter, draftsman, watercolorist, in short, an astounding inventor of images and besides that, an outstanding protagonist of his generation in Scandinavia.
In his paintings figures, plants, symbols or writing appear, only to vanish in amorphous color or unbound surface-ornaments, in the next blink of an eye – just as the becoming and passing away of nature.
Yet, compared to the Vanitas of human existence or a baroque memento mori, Adam Saks reveals an encouraging confirmation of live. His pictures are situated in a state of constant transformation, they bundle and unfold an immense swirl of impressions, memories, emotions and moods. A life in color which occasionally loses itself and regains itself at another place as seen in the exhibition Inhaling Darkness Exhaling Galaxies at Kunstverein Reutlingen (Germany 2017)

In 2011 and 2012 Adam Saks devoted himself extensively to examining the relationship between human beings and nature, or the human figure as an integral part of the organic cycle of life.
Multiple influences flow together in Adam Saks's paintings and paperworks. He lets himself drift through travel narratives; directly into the horror of plundering, pillaging and colonialism with its solitude and aggression (e.g. the French Foreign Legion); through compendiums of heraldry and emblemata; and out of cheap comics or tattoo magazines – seafarer's or criminal tattoos as traces of human presence.

Adam Saks has created several artist books with Schaefer Grafisk Vaerksted, Copenhagen. Among them Deep Drawings (2004), Raid (2004) and Fill Your Hands (2007) are made in the monochrome technique of direct transfer in a limited edition of 250 copies each. Elephant Island (2009) is a faksimile of a large ink drawing which – like James Joyce's ulyssian stream of consciousness – waves and weaves itself as well as a massive array of motifal flotsam throughout the whole 29,7 × 630 cm long span of the book rawly bound as Japanese paperback.

Adam Saks has had numerous institutional solo exhibitions, e.g.,  Lieu D´art Contemporain in Narbonne (France, 2008, 2018), the Nordiska Akvarellmuseet (Sweden, 2009), the ARoS – Aarhus Kunstmuseum (Denmark, 2010), the Städtische Galerie Offenburg (Germany, 2012), Kunsthal Nord - Aalborg (Denmark, 2016), Kunstverein Reutlingen (Germany, 2017)

Awards (selection) 
 2015 Kjell Nupen Memorial Grant
 2009 Niels Wessel Bagges Art Foundation

Biennales & Triennials (selection) 
 2016 International Print Biennale, Newcastle, England
 2010 False Recognition, 14th Vilnius Painting Triennial, Vilnius, Lithuania

Exhibitions (selection) 

 2020 Adam og Asger, with Asger Jorn, Galerie Moderne, Silkeborg, Denmark
 2019 We Are The Human Waterfall, Galerie MøllerWitt, Copenhagen, Denmark
 2018 Infinite Voyage, Galerie Forsblom; Helsinki, Finland
 2018 Pilgrim on a Hidden Path, Meliksetian & Briggs, Los Angeles / CA, USA
 2018 Loops of Utopia, Lieu d'Art Contemporain, Narbonne, France
 2017 Adam Saks, Kunstverein Reutlingen, Reutlingen, Germany
 2016 Setting Sail In A Teadrop Of Fear And Desire, Kunsthal NORD, Aalborg, Denmark
 2015 Strange Fates Some Fruits Are Given, Galleri Møller-Witt, Aarhus, Denmark
 2015 Adam Saks, Galleri Ismene, Trondheim, Norway
 2014 I Am A Ghost I Am A Totem I Am A Still Life, Galerie Forsblom, Helsinki, Finland
 2014 Adam Saks, Künstlerhaus Bethanien, Berlin, Germany
 2014 Flora Empire, Galerie Møller Witt, Denmark
 2013 Portrait of the Moon & a Single Blue Frog, Galerie Forsblom, Helsinki, Finland
 2012 Ende Neu, Städtische Galerie, Offenburg, Germany
 2012 Atropa, Bourouina Gallery, Berlin, Germany
 2011 Follow You Follow Me, Bourouina Gallery, Berlin, Germany
 2010 Visual Voodoo, ARoS – Aarhus Kunstmuseum, Aarhus, Denmark
 2010 Dry your Eyes, Galleri Christoffer Egelund, Copenhagen, Denmark
 2009 Mexican Standoff, Schaefer Grafisk Vaerksted, Copenhagen, Denmark
 2009 Lone Star, Nordiska Akvarellmuseet, Skärhamn, Sweden
 2009 Sacré Nom de Dieu, Bourouina Gallery, Berlin, Germany
 2008 Victime de sa Force, L.A.C, Narbonne, France
 2007 Pazi Snajper, Galerie Kapinos, Berlin, Germany
 2006 Transgressor, Aarhus Kunstbygning, Aarhus, Denmark
 2006 Marion, Nur Für Dich, Schaefer Grafisk Vaerksted, Copenhagen, Denmark

Group exhibitions (selection) 
2020 Explorations, Turku Art Museum, Turku, Finland
2020 Bed and Clock, Moon and Beach: Edvard Munch, Galerie Max Hetzler, Berlin, Germany
2019 Nordisk Akvareller 2019, Frederikshavn Kunstmuseum, Frederikshavn, Denmark
2018 Fusion, Nordiska Akvarelmuseet, Skärhamn, Sweden
2018 New Black Romanticism, Topičuv Salon, Prague, Czech Republic
2018 New Black Romanticism, Künstlerhaus Palais Thurn und Taxis, Bregenz, Austria
2018 New Black Romanticism, Galerie der Stadt Backnang, Germany
2017 Neue Schwarze Romantik, Künstlerhaus Bethanien, Berlin, Germany
2017 New Black Romanticism, Muzeul Național de Artă al României, Bucharest, Romania
2017 New Black Romanticism, Stadtgalerie Kiel, Germany
2017 Galleri Ismene, Trondheim, Norway
2016 Vitales Echo, Künstlerhaus Bethanien, Berlin, Germany
2016 International Print Biennale, Newcastle, UK
2016 Træsnit, Galerie Moderne, Silkeborg, Denmark
2016 Let’s Get Physical: Spatial Confrontations and Narrative Collisions, KKW, Leipzig, Germany
 2015 Out of the Darkness, ARoS, Aarhus, Denmark
 2015 Vattenkonst, Nordiska Akvarellmuseet, Skarham, Sweden
 2015 Berlin Artists’ Statements, BWAContemporary Art Gallery, Katowice, Poland
 2014 Wo ist hier? #1: Malerei und Gegenwart, Kunstverein Reutlingen, Reutlingen, Germany
 2014 Luggage and Observations, Galerie Klaus Gerrit Friese, Stuttgart, Germany
 2014 Cap Jorn, Galerie Moderne, Silkeborg, Denmark
 2013 Under Pressure, Stolper & Friends, Oslo, Norway
 2013 Moraltarantula 6, Hamburg, Germany
 2012 Flying, Künstlerhaus Bethanien, Berlin, Germany
 2012 Charade", Sammlung Haubrok,  Berlin, Germany
 2012 Light & Space, Nordiska Akvarellmuseet, Sweden
 2012 Status Berlin (1), Künstlerhaus Bethanien, Berlin, Germany
 2012 Merchandizing, Wonderloch Kellerland, Berlin, Germany
 2010 New Impressions, Bourouina Gallery, Berlin, Germany

 Public Collections (selection) 
 Kiasma (Finland)
 EMMA – Espoo Museum of Modern Art (Finland)
 ARoS Aarhus Kunstmuseum (Denmark)
 Kunsten – Museum of Modern Art, Aalborg (Denmark)
 LAC – Lieu d’Art Contemporain, Narbonne (France)
 Malmø Kunstmuseum, Malmø (Sweden)
 Nordiska Akvarellmuseet, Skärhamn (Sweden)
 Sønderjyllands Kunstmuseum, Tønder (Denmark)
 Statens Kunstfond, Copenhagen (Denmark)
 Statens Museum for Kunst, Copenhagen (Denmark)

 Artist Books(selection) 
 Lubok no. 8, Lubok Verlag Leipzig, 2013
 Night Stalker, artist book, edited by Dorothee Heine and Christian Malycha, Q1, Berlin, 2011
 Elephant Island, artist book, Schäfer Grafisk Værksted, text by Christian Malycha, Kerber Verlag, Bielefeld 2009
 Fill Your Hands, artist book, Schäfer Grafisk Værksted, Copenhagen 2007
 Raid, artist book, Schäfer Grafisk Værksted, Copenhagen 2005
 Re-Raid, artist book, Schäfer Grafisk Værksted, Copenhagen 2005
 Deep Drawings, artist book, Schäfer Grafisk Værksted, Copenhagen 2004

 Solo Publications (selection) 
 Flora Empire, Seven Etchings, Atelier Larsen, Helsingborg, 2013
 Portrait of the Moon & a Single Blue Frog, Galerie Forsblom, text: Leevi Haapala, 2013
 Atropa, Gallery Bourouina, tekst: Christoph Tannert, 2012
 Ende Neu, catalogue edited by Städtische Galerie Offenburg, texts by Gerlinde Brandenburger-Eisele, Christian Malycha and Roberto Ohrt, Offenburg, 2012
 Follow You Follow Me, catalogue edited by Bourouina Gallery, interview with Adam Saks by David Ulrichs, Berlin, 2011
 Nausikaa, catalogue edited by Dorothee Heine and Christian Malycha, Q.H.S.O.I.Q.O.C.M.S. 4, Berlin 2010
 Visual Voodoo, catalogue edited by ARoS – Aarhus Kunstmuseum, texts by Marie Nipper and Jens Erik Sørensen, Aarhus 2010
 Dry your Eyes, catalogue edited by  Galleri Christoffer Egelund, text by Tine Nygaard, Copenhagen 2010
 Sea Level – Sailors and Prisoners. Coloured Pencil Drawings, edited by Josef Kleinheinrich, text by Kay Heymer, Buchkunst Kleinheinrich, Münster 2009
 Lonestar, catalogue edited by the Nordiska Akvarellmuseet, texts by Bernd Koberling, Bera Nordal and Björn Springfeldt, Skärhamn, 2009
 Sacré Nom de Dieu!, catalogue edited by Bourouina Gallery, text by Christian Malycha, Berlin, 2009
 Victime de Sa Force, catalogue edited by Lieu D´art Contemporain, text by Thorsten Sadowsky, Narbonne 2008
 Transgressor, catalogue edited by Galleri Veggerby, Copenhagen 2006
 Fatalité, catalogue edited by Vikingsberg Kunsthal, text by Björn Springfeldt, Helsingborg 2005
 Machete'', catalogue edited by Sønderjyllands Kunstmuseum, text by Thorsten Sadowsky, Tønder 2003

External links
 Adam Saks
 Galerie Forsblom
 Kerber Verlag Bielefeld
 BuchKunst Kleinheinrich Münster

References
 ARoS - Aarhus Kunstmuseum, Aarhus, Denmark
 artfacts
 Documentary
 Documentary

Living people
1974 births
Artists from Copenhagen
Artists from Berlin
20th-century Danish painters
21st-century Danish painters